Koonung Secondary College is a secondary state school in Mont Albert North, Victoria, in the eastern suburbs of Melbourne, Australia. The school takes its name from the nearby Koonung Creek.

Its school catchment includes the suburbs of Mont Albert, Mont Albert North, Balwyn, Balwyn North, Doncaster, Box Hill, Box Hill North, Surrey Hills and Burwood.

On 13 June 2019, it received a grant of $6.05 million to improve its facilities.

Curriculum 
Koonung follows the VELS (Victorian Essential Learning Standards) for the years 7–10 curriculum. A standard VCE (Victorian Certificate of Education) course is run in years 11 & 12 (year 10 students also have the option to take one or two VCE subjects), with a range of VET (Vocational educational Training) subjects also available.

Notable former students 
Zac Clarke-AFL footballer 
Josh Daicos-AFL footballer
Daniel Pearce (footballer)-AFL footballer

References

External links 
 

Public high schools in Melbourne
Educational institutions established in 1964
1964 establishments in Australia
Buildings and structures in the City of Whitehorse